Alec Trevelyan (006) is a fictional character and the main antagonist in the 1995 James Bond film GoldenEye, the first film to feature actor Pierce Brosnan as Bond. Trevelyan is portrayed by actor Sean Bean. The likeness of Bean as Alec Trevelyan was also used for the 1997 video game GoldenEye 007.

Film biography

Character information 
Originally known as "Agent 006" under the employment of Her Majesty's Secret Service, Trevelyan betrays MI6 during a mission to blow up the Arkhangelsk chemical weapons facility in the Soviet Union while working with his friend and fellow agent, James Bond (Pierce Brosnan). During the operation, Trevelyan is caught and apparently executed by the base's commander, General Arkady Ourumov (Gottfried John). Presuming Trevelyan dead, Bond continues the mission and escapes aboard a supply plane. Bond later admits to M (Judi Dench) that he feels responsible for Trevelyan's apparent death.

Nine years later, Bond's pursuit of a stolen helicopter and investigation of an explosion at Severnaya leads him to Saint Petersburg, where he learns from gangster Valentin Zukovsky (Robbie Coltrane) that "Janus", the head of the crime syndicate responsible for the theft, is a Lienz Cossack. Later, when he finally meets Janus, Bond is shocked to discover Trevelyan, who staged his own execution at Arkhangelsk and now employs Ourumov, now a General in the Russian army. Trevelyan's face is scarred from the explosion at the weapons factory, a direct result of Bond changing the sequence detonation timers.

Trevelyan reveals that his motive for his betrayal is a personal one. His parents were Lienz Cossacks who had collaborated with the Nazis but attempted to defect to the UK at the end of World War II. When the UK instead sent them back to the Soviets, many were executed by Joseph Stalin's death squads. Though Trevelyan's parents survived, his father, ashamed to have lived, killed his wife and himself. At the time, Trevelyan was only six years old. He was then transported to the United Kingdom and taken in by MI6, which continued to sponsor his training and education throughout his childhood (by Trevelyan's own account, MI6 thought he would have been "too young to remember"). He began formal work for the British government upon turning 18 and began planning his revenge against the British government for his family's demise. He had considered asking Bond to join him in his scheme, but knew deep down that Bond would never betray MI6.

Scheme 
Trevelyan's scheme begins with the theft of the experimental Tiger helicopter from the French frigate La Fayette docked in Monte Carlo, using his two primary operatives, Ourumov and Xenia Onatopp (Famke Janssen). With the helicopter, the two fly to the GoldenEye satellite facility in Severnaya, where they murder the staff and steal the access disk and keys for the GoldenEye satellite and program the satellite to target the facility in order to cover up the theft. The GoldenEye satellite is actually two disposable satellites named Petya and Mischa, which are capable of emitting targeted electromagnetic pulses capable of destroying any machinery with an electronic signal. As Petya destroys the Severnaya facility, Ourumov and Onatopp escape aboard the Tiger helicopter, which is insulated against electromagnetic radiation.

With the help of traitorous Severnaya programmer Boris Grishenko (Alan Cumming), Trevelyan plans to use Mischa to help him electronically steal hundreds of millions of pounds sterling from the Bank of England in London, with its electromagnetic pulse causing a blackout in London that would erase all evidence of the transaction. Mischa would also erase the bank's financial records, crippling the British economy and government, triggering a catastrophic currency crisis, and causing global economic chaos.

Bond stops this scheme with the help of surviving Severnaya technician Natalya Simonova (Izabella Scorupco) and CIA agent Jack Wade (Joe Don Baker). Wade helps Bond and Natalya track Trevelyan's headquarters, and Natalya subsequently programs the GoldenEye satellite to crash after resetting the access codes. As Bond attempts to disable the GoldenEye antenna, Trevelyan attacks him. In the subsequent fight, Trevelyan finally gets the better of Bond and is about to shoot him when Bond kicks a ladder releasing it and carrying Bond to the bottom of a satellite antenna, suspended high above the dish. Trevelyan then climbs down to Bond, who slips and is just able to stay on the tiny platform. Bond eventually knocks Trevelyan off the antenna, but reflexively grabs him by the leg. While hanging, Trevelyan smugly asks Bond, "For England, James?" Bond replies, "No, for me," and lets go. Trevelyan falls all the way down to the dish; he survives but is mortally wounded. Moments later, the antenna array, due to Bond's sabotage, explodes and collapses in a fiery wreck on top of Trevelyan, killing him.

GoldenEye 007 (video game)

The original GoldenEye 007 had no voiceovers, and thus no voice actor played Alec Trevelyan. He is based almost completely on his GoldenEye persona, including appearance and back-story.
The 2010 enhanced remake of the original updates the story, setting it to the present day. With his original motivation of revenge for his parents' betrayal no longer practical given his age, Trevelyan's motives for betraying the United Kingdom are now his disgust at the current economic system; it is implied that he was actively involved in operations as Janus while still working with MI6 rather than starting Janus after his 'death'. His essential plan remains the same, however. His appearance has changed as well. His background includes having served in the Parachute Regiment prior to joining MI6. He is voiced by Elliot Cowan and also uses Cowan's likeness.

Reception
Trevelyan was the only 00 Agent (other than Bond himself) to have a substantial role in a Bond film, including sizeable screen and speaking time, until the debut of Lashana Lynch's Nomi in 2021's No Time to Die. Previously, the only other '00' agent to have had any amount of screen time or to play a role in a Bond film was Octopussys 009, portrayed by stuntman Andy Bradford. 

Apart from seeing the back of their heads or shortly before they are killed and/or dead already (Thunderball, A View to a Kill, and The Living Daylights), other 00 agents are rarely seen and only spoken of (an example being Agent 002 Bill Fairbanks in  The Man with the Golden Gun, who is only mentioned). When Bean auditioned for the film, he was considered for the role of Bond (see List of actors considered for the James Bond character).

Trevelyan has been consistently ranked among the greatest Bond villains, and is considered the dark inversion of Bond.

References

Bond villains
Fictional gangsters
Film characters introduced in 1995
Fictional mass murderers
Fictional British secret agents
Fictional Russian people
Orphan characters in film
GoldenEye
Fictional characters with disfigurements
Video game bosses
Fictional terrorists
Fictional Cossacks
Male film villains
Action film villains
Fictional crime bosses
Film supervillains